Docking is a surname. Notable people with the surname include:

Alan Docking, founder of Alan Docking Racing
Alfred Docking (1860–1938), missionary in the United States
George Docking (1904–1964), politician in the U.S. state of Kansas
Jeffrey Docking (born 1961), president of Adrian College in Michigan
Jonathan Docking (born 1964), Australian rugby league footballer
Robert Docking (1925–1983), politician in the U.S. state of Kansas
Stanley Docking (1914−1940), English footballer
Thomas Docking (1954-2017), politician in the U.S. state of Kansas
Trevor Docking (born 1952), Australian cricketer